Beth Munro (born 23 June 1993) is a British parataekwondo practitioner from Liverpool. She competed at the 2020 Summer Paralympics in the –58 kg K44 category. She won a silver medal and it was the UK's first Taekwondo medal.

Life
Munro comes from Litherland which is in Northern Liverpool. When she was born in 1993 she had a weakness in one arm. She had an ambition to get to the Paralympics and she was initially interested in Netball. She intended to switch to the javelin, but she was recruited two years before the postponed 2020 Summer Paralympics by Anthony Hughes of Disability Sport Wales to take up Taekwondo. The martial art which would make its debut as a Paralympic sport in the "2020" games in Tokyo.

She was classified to compete in the –58 kg K44 category.

Munro's first match was a 21–8 win over Palesha Goverdhan of Nepal which she won 21–8. In the second round she had a more difficult match against Games Gurdal of Turkey, but she won 34–22.

She won a silver medal after being defeated by Lisa Gjessing of Denmark. It was the UK's first Taekwondo medal.

References

1993 births
Living people
British female taekwondo practitioners
Taekwondo practitioners at the 2020 Summer Paralympics
Paralympic silver medalists for Great Britain
Paralympic medalists in taekwondo
Medalists at the 2020 Summer Paralympics
People from Liverpool
21st-century British women